Isaranuudom Phurihiranphat (born 26 June 2004) is a Thai sports shooter. He competed in the men's 25 metre rapid fire pistol event at the 2020 Summer Olympics.

References

External links
 

2004 births
Living people
Isaranuudom Phurihiranphat
Isaranuudom Phurihiranphat
Shooters at the 2020 Summer Olympics
Isaranuudom Phurihiranphat
Shooters at the 2018 Asian Games
Isaranuudom Phurihiranphat